Hélène Napoleone Bonaparte (18 June 1816 – 16 January 1907) was the reputed daughter of Napoleon by his mistress, Albine de Montholon, wife of Charles Tristan, marquis de Montholon, and sister of Charles-François-Frédéric, marquis de Montholon-Sémonville.

She was born Napoléone Marie Hélène Charlotte de Montholon-Sémonville in Saint Helena while Albine and Montholon were with Napoleon in exile there. Napoleon never acknowledged Hélène, although she was said to bear a striking resemblance to him. Nothing else is known of Hélène's life after she left Saint Helena. She died at Aix-en-Provence, aged 90.

References

1816 births
1907 deaths
Helene Napoleone Bonaparte
French nobility